Benjamin Franklin Tracy (April 26, 1830August 6, 1915) was a United States political figure who served as Secretary of the Navy from 1889 through 1893, during the administration of U.S. President Benjamin Harrison.

Biography
He was born in the hamlet of Apalachin located in the Town of Owego, New York on April 26, 1830.

Tracy was a lawyer active in Republican Party politics during the 1850s. He was a member of the New York State Assembly (Tioga Co.) in 1862.

He served in the Union Army during the Civil War, and commanded the 109th New York Infantry Regiment. At the Battle of the Wilderness in May, 1864, he was able to rally his men and hold the Union line. For his actions he subsequently was awarded the Medal of Honor. His citation reads: Tracy "seized the colors and led the regiment when other regiments had retired and then reformed his line and held it." Later that year, he became commandant of the Elmira prisoner of war camp, before being appointed Colonel of the 127th Infantry, U.S. Colored Troops, on August 23, 1864. Tracy was discharged from the volunteer service on June 13, 1865. On January 18, 1867, President Andrew Johnson nominated Tracy for appointment to the brevet grade of brigadier general of volunteers, to rank from March 13, 1865, and the U.S. Senate confirmed the appointment on February 21, 1867.

He resumed the practice of law after the war, and became active in New York state politics. He was United States Attorney for the Eastern District of New York from 1866 to 1877. In December 1881, he was appointed by Governor Alonzo B. Cornell to the New York Court of Appeals to fill the vacancy caused by the appointment of Judge Charles Andrews as Chief Judge after the resignation of Charles J. Folger. Tracy remained on the bench until the end of 1882 when Andrews resumed his seat after being defeated by William C. Ruger in the election for Chief Judge.

In 1875, Tracy defended the well-known preacher Henry Ward Beecher during his highly publicized trial for adultery.

Tracy was noted for his role in the creation of the "New Navy", a major reform of the service, which had fallen into obsolescence after the Civil War.  Like President Harrison, he supported a naval strategy focused more on offense, rather than on coastal defense and commerce raiding.  A major ally in this effort was naval theorist Captain Alfred Thayer Mahan, who had served as a professor at the new Naval War College (founded 1884).  In 1890, Mahan published his major work, The Influence of Sea Power upon History, 1660–1783—a book that achieved an international readership.  Drawing on historical examples, Mahan supported the construction of a "blue-water Navy" that could do battle on the high seas.

Tracy also supported the construction of modern warships. On June 30, 1890, Congress passed the Naval Appropriations Act for Fiscal Year 1891 (also known as the Battleship Act of 1890), a measure which authorized the construction of three battleships. The battleship  was authorized two years later.

Tracy's wife and child died in a fire at their residence in Washington, DC in 1890.

In the 1896 presidential election, Tracy was a presidential elector for William McKinley and Garret Hobart.

After leaving the Navy Department, Tracy again took up his legal practice. In 1896 he defended New York City Police commissioner Andrew Parker from accusations of negligence and incompetence by fellow commissioner Theodore Roosevelt in a performance that significantly embarrassed Roosevelt. He also helped end the Venezuela Crisis of 1895 by assisting Venezuela in negotiating a settlement to their boundary dispute with Great Britain.

Tracy was the Republican candidate to be the first Mayor of Greater New York City when the five boroughs consolidated in 1898. He came in third behind Democrat Robert A. Van Wyck and Seth Low of the Citizens' Union, winning 101,863 of the 523,560 votes cast in the election of 1897.  Tracy was the president of the New York State Agricultural Society in 1897 and 1898, during which time he invited Van Wyck to attend the society's annual fair.

On April 3, 1900, seven men from the International Banking and Trust Company were elected as directors of the North American Trust Company. They included president Oakleigh Thorne of the International, as well as Tracy.

Family and death
Tracy died at his farm in Tioga County, New York on August 6, 1915 at 3:30 am at the home of his daughter.

Medal of Honor citation

Rank and organization: Colonel, 109th New York Infantry.

Place and date: At Wilderness, Va., 6 May 1864.

Entered service at: Owego, N.Y.

Born: 26 April 1830, Owego, N.Y.

Date of issue: 21 June 1895.

Citation:
Seized the colors and led the regiment when other regiments had retired and then reformed his line and held it.

Namesake
 was named for him, as was the town of Tracyton, Washington.

Tracy Arm is a fjord in the U.S. state of Alaska that bears his name.

The Tracy Glacier, having its terminus near the head of the Inglefield Fjord in NW Greenland, was named after him by Robert Peary.

See also

List of American Civil War Medal of Honor recipients: T–Z

Notes

References
 Eicher, John H., and David J. Eicher, Civil War High Commands. Stanford: Stanford University Press, 2001. .

Further reading
Cooling, Benjamin F.  Benjamin Franklin Tracy, Father of the American Fighting Navy. Hamden, Conn.: Archon Books, 1973.

External links

 

 (Copyright notice from Naval Historical Center website: "Used by permission of Charles Scribner's Sons, an imprint of Simon & Schuster Macmillan from Encyclopedia of the American Military, John E. Jessup, Editor in Chief. Vol. I, pp. 365-380. Copyright c 1994, Charles Scribner's Sons, 1633 Broadway, New York, NY 10019. [The views expressed in this history are those of the author and do not reflect the official policy or position of the Department of the Navy or the U.S. government.]")

 Project Gutenberg link to Mahan's The Influence of Sea Power Upon History, 1660–1783

1830 births
1915 deaths
Burials at Green-Wood Cemetery
United States Army Medal of Honor recipients
Union Army generals
United States Secretaries of the Navy
People of New York (state) in the American Civil War
Judges of the New York Court of Appeals
United States Attorneys for the Eastern District of New York
Republican Party members of the New York State Assembly
People from Owego, New York
Benjamin Harrison administration cabinet members
19th-century American politicians
American Civil War recipients of the Medal of Honor
North American Trust Company people
1896 United States presidential electors
19th-century American judges